This list comprises all players who have participated in at least one league match for Penn FC (formerly Harrisburg City Islanders) since the team's first season in USL in 2004. Players who were on the roster but never played a first team game are not listed; players who appeared for the team in other competitions (US Open Cup, CONCACAF Champions League, etc.) but never actually made an USL appearance are noted at the bottom of the page where appropriate.

A "†" denotes players who only appeared in a single match.

A
  Brian Ackley
  Don Anding
  Coady Andrews
  José Angulo
  Eric Ayuk †

B
  Matt Bahner
  Nathan Baker
  Almir Barbosa
  José Barril
  Art Bartholomew
  David Bascome
  Stephen Basso
  Clésio Baúque
  Nelson Becerra
  Michael Behonick
  Cardel Benbow
  Teafore Bennett
  Eric Bird
  Sam Bishop
  Dustin Bixler
  Milton Blanco
  Geoff Bloes
  Matt Bolduc
  Josh Bolton
  Tom Brandt
  Keasel Broome
  Haven Bruce
  Antonio Bua
  Phillip Buffington

C
  Kenny Caceros
  Anthony Calvano
  Ian Carter
  Shane Campbell
  Francesco Caruso
  Dzenan Catic
  Danny Cepero
  Freddie Chambers
  Tomer Chencinski
  Adam Clay
  Raphael Cox
  Shane Crawford
  Matt Crist
  Steve Custer

D
  Mouhamed Dabo
  Brian Devlin
  Robbie Derschang
  Anthony Di Biase
  Danny DiPrima
  John DiRaimondo †
  Tony Donatelli
  Seamus Donnelly
  J. T. Dorsey
  Liam Doyle
  Bilal Duckett
  Shaquille Dyer

E
  Darvin Ebanks †
  Edinho Júnior
  Yann Ekra
  Erick

F
  Mike Feniger
  Leo Fernandes
  Steve Fisher
  David Flynn
  Craig Foster

G
  Jani Galik

H
  Tishan Hanley
  Jamiel Hardware
  Chase Harrison
  Tom Heinemann †
  Ryan Heins
  Jay Herford †
  Cristhian Hernández
  Jason Herrick †
  Bryan Hill
  Chris Hill
  Chandler Hoffman
  Brian Holt †
  Antoine Hoppenot
  Yu Hoshide
  Jason Hotchkin
  Andrew Hoxie †
  Josh Hughes

I
  Sumed Ibrahim

J
  Nate Jafta
  Brett Jankouskas
  Shane Johnson
  Greg Jordan

K
  Kai Kasiguran
  Dave Kern
  Aleksey Korol

L
  Morgan Langley
  John Lapore
  Raymond Lee
  Adrian LeRoy
  Dante Leverock
  Mike Lookingland
  Luan
  Andrew Lubahn

M
  Nigel Marples
  Richie Marquez
  Andrew Marshall
  Jason Massie
  Kyle McCord
  David McClellan
  Jack McInerney †
  Jimmy McLaughlin
  Shawn McLaws
  Tom Mellor
  Henry Mensah
  Jamel Mitchell
  Mpho Moloi
  Carlos Morales
  Chris Morman
  Lucky Mkosana

N
  Youssef Naciri
  Matthew Nelson
  Nick Noble
  J. T. Noone
  Ciaran Nugent †
  Tino Nuñez

O
  Mo Oduor
  Brian Ombiji
  Ryan O'Neill
  Dominic Oppong

P
  Nicki Paterson
  Jeff Pearce
  Jason Pelletier
  Anthony Peters †
  Garret Pettis
  Zach Pfeffer
  Ryan Pierce
  Jason Plumhoff
  Brian Pope
  Derek Potteiger

R
  Cody Reinberg
  Kyle Renfro †
  Andrew Ribeiro
  Pedro Ribeiro
  Damani Richards †
  Ryan Richter †
  Patrick Robertson
  David Rodriguez
  Tyler Ruthven
  Tommy Rutter

S
  Justin Sadler
  Shea Salinas †
  David Schofield
  Adam Schultz
  Jordan Seabrook
  Chad Severs
  Neil Shaffer
  Conor Shanosky
  Ty Shipalane
  Bernie Showers
  Toni Ståhl †
  Yuki Stalph
  James Stevens
  Jimmy Stone
  Brandon Swartzendruber
  Kyle Swords
  Bryan Sylvestre

T
  Matt Tanzini
  Jeritt Thayer
  Jamie Thomas
  Sainey Touray
  Ken Tribbett
  Phil Tuttle
  Craig Tyrrell

V
  Enric Vallès
  Tim Velten
  Cameron Vickers

W
  Bobby Warshaw
  Andrew Welker
  Aaron Wheeler
  Ethan White
  Steven Widdowson
  Brett Wiesner
  Sheanon Williams
  Paul Wilson

Y
  Drew Yates

Z
  Ryan Zabinski
  Nick Zimmerman
  Colin Zizzi

Sources

Harrisburg City Islanders
 
Association football player non-biographical articles